The following is a list of awards and nominations received by The O.C., an American teen drama television series.

Artios Awards
The Artios Awards have been presented since 1985 for excellence in casting. Hosted by the Casting Society of America, theatrical casting in over eighteen categories is honored. The O.C. has received one nomination.

Logie Awards
The Logie Awards have been awarded since 1959. Hosted by TV Week, the Australian television industry honor excellence in Australian television. The O.C. has received one award.

People's Choice Awards
The People's Choice Awards have been held annually since 1975. Hosted by Procter & Gamble they claim to honor shows based on the opinions of the general public. The O.C. has received one nomination.

PRISM Awards
The PRISM Awards are awarded annually to shows making realistic depictions of dependence. Hosted by the Entertainment Industries Council it honors programs that have dealt with drug, alcohol and tobacco issues well. The O.C. has received one award from seven nominations.

Teen Choice Awards
The Teen Choice Awards are presented annually by the Fox Broadcasting Company and Global Television Network. The program honors the year's biggest achievements in music, movies, sports, and television, as voted by teenagers aged twelve to nineteen. The O.C. has received twelve awards from twenty-three nominations.

TCA Awards
The Television Critics Association (or TCA) is a group of approximately 200 United States and Canadian journalists and columnists who cover television programming. Since 1984 the organization has hosted the TCA Awards, honoring television excellence in 11 categories, which are presented every summer. The O.C. has received one nomination.

WGA Awards
The Writers Guild of America Awards are presented annually by the Writers Guild of America. The O.C. has received one nomination.

Young Artist Awards
Beginning in 1981, the Young Artist Awards have been presented yearly in Los Angeles by the Young Artist Foundation. The O.C. has received one nomination.

Footnotes

External links
 Awards won by The O.C. at IMDb

The O.C.
O.C., The